Stefanie Mach is a former Democratic member of the Arizona House of Representatives. Mach was involved in a car accident in her teens that left her companion dead and her with life-altering injuries. In addition to serving in the legislature, Mach also operates CM Concordia Consulting, which specializes in non-profit and political consulting to address societal problems and positively impact communities.

Elections
2014 Mach and Bruce Wheeler were unopposed in the Democratic primary. Mach and Wheeler defeated William Wildish and Todd Clodfelter in the general election.
2012 Mach and incumbent Bruce Wheeler defeated Brandon Patrick in the Democratic primary and defeated Republican incumbent Ted Vogt and Todd Clodfelter with Mach receiving 40,843 votes.

References

External links
 
 Legislative website

Living people
Brown University alumni
University of Wisconsin–Stevens Point alumni
Democratic Party members of the Arizona House of Representatives
Women state legislators in Arizona
American amputees
American politicians with disabilities
Politicians from Tucson, Arizona
21st-century American politicians
21st-century American women politicians
Year of birth missing (living people)